Lamparter is a surname. Notable people with the surname include: 

Johannes Lamparter (born 2001), Austrian skier
Thomas Lamparter (born 1978), Swiss bobsledder